The UMass Lowell Men's Lacrosse team is a college lacrosse team that represents UMass Lowell in Lowell, Massachusetts, United States. The school's teams are members of the America East Conference. Ed Stephenson was hired on August 1, 2013 to become the program's first head coach.

The Ed Stephenson Years 

Ed Stephenson was hired as the first Men's lacrosse coach in UMass Lowell's history as a DI program in 2013. He led the River Hawks for eight seasons from 2015 through 2022, when he resigned. The Stephenson era at UMass Lowell was dominated by losing seasons as he led the River Hawks to an overall record of 28-77 and never had a winning season during his tenure.

2018 was the height of the Stephenson era as the River Hawks went 8-8 during their fourth season as a DI program and made the America East Tournament, where they fell to top-seeded UAlbany.

During the Stephenson era, UMass Lowell produced five Second-Team All-Conference selections and seven America East All-Rookie selections. In 2019, midfielder Dan Cozzi and faceoff man Liam McDonough became the first players in program history to be named First-Team All-Conference honorees.

The Drew Kelleher Years 

Drew Kelleher was hired as the second head coach in UMass Lowell Men's lacrosse history on June 16, 2022.

Year by year results
{| class="wikitable"

|- align="center"

†NCAA canceled 2020 collegiate activities due to the COVID-19 virus.

References

External links
 Official website

College men's lacrosse teams in the United States
America East Conference men's lacrosse